The ovenbird is a small songbird of the New World warbler family. It may also refer to:

Ovenbird (family), a large group of birds in the family Furnariidae
"The Oven Bird", a 1916 poem by Robert Frost